Domingo Emanuelli Hernández is a Puerto Rican lawyer and politician serving as the secretary of justice of Puerto Rico.

Education
Emanuelli completed a Bachelor of Arts degree, magna cum laude, in general studies from the University of Puerto Rico and a Juris Doctor, cum laude, from the University of Puerto Rico School of Law.

Career 
Emanuelli is a member of the Bar Association of Puerto Rico and admitted to practice in Puerto Rico, the United States District Court for the District of Puerto Rico, and the United States Court of Appeals for the First Circuit.

Emanuelli is a lawyer specialized in corporate, commercial, and civil litigation. He started his career at a law firm in Arecibo, Puerto Rico. , Emanuelli had practiced law for over 43 years.  

On January 2, 2021, governor Pedro Pierluisi nominated Emanuelli to serve as the secretary of justice of Puerto Rico. In March 2021, the senate confirmed his nomination. He succeeded acting secretary Inés Del C. Carrau Martínez. Emanuelli is a member of the New Progressive Party.

References

Citations

Bibliography 

 

 

Living people
Year of birth missing (living people)
Place of birth missing (living people)
People from Arecibo, Puerto Rico
21st-century Puerto Rican lawyers
21st-century Puerto Rican politicians
Secretaries of Justice of Puerto Rico
New Progressive Party (Puerto Rico) politicians
University of Puerto Rico alumni